Rishi Ketan Patel (born 26 July 1998) is an English cricketer. He has played for Essex's Second XI side, and signed a professional contract with Essex in 2018. He made his first-class debut on 26 March 2019, for Cambridge MCCU against Essex, as part of the Marylebone Cricket Club University fixtures. He made his List A debut on 28 April 2019, for Essex in the 2019 Royal London One-Day Cup. In October 2020, he was signed by Leicestershire County Cricket Club on a three-year deal. Patel made his Twenty20 debut on 10 June 2021, for Leicestershire in the 2021 T20 Blast.

References

External links
 

1998 births
Living people
English cricketers
Cambridge MCCU cricketers
Essex cricketers
People from Chigwell
Hertfordshire cricketers
Leicestershire cricketers